Creosote was a community of Bainbridge Island, Washington, along Eagle Harbor.  The area is directly visible from the downtown Bainbridge Island community of Winslow. Originally named Eagle Harbor in 1886, in 1908 the name was changed to Creosote because of the manufacturing and application of creosote at the now-defunct Wyckoff Company plant in the area.  The former industrial site is to the north of the community of Bill Point and east of the community of Eagledale at the southern side of the entrance to Eagle Harbor.  The site is now the city-owned Pritchard Park and is undergoing Superfund clean-up.

See also
 List of Bainbridge Island communities

References

Communities of Bainbridge Island, Washington